The First Lady of Chile is the title for the wife of the president of Chile, who is traditionally responsible for directing and coordinating activities in the social field of the presidency and also accompany the president in ceremonies or official activities, for example, on state visit. Although not an official title, it is widely used in formal protocol and has been used in some decrees.

History 
In colonial times, the wives of the royal governors (known also as "presidents") were called Presidentas. The title was still in use after Chile become a republic in the 19th century; the term, was slowly superseded by the newer First Lady, similar to the one used in other countries.

Due to the complex evolution of the Head of State of Chile after the emancipation from Spain and the non-official character of the title, it is not possible to define who was the "first First Lady". Potential options include:

 María Nicolasa Valdés, wife of Mateo de Toro Zambrano, former Royal Governor and first President of the Government Junta (1810).
 Mercedes Fontecilla, wife of José Miguel Carrera, first Commander-in-Chief of the Chilean Army and president of the Provisional Government Junta (1811–1813)
 Isabel Riquelme, mother of Bernardo O'Higgins, first Supreme Director of Chile as an independent country (1818–1823).
 Carmen Gana, wife of Manuel Blanco Encalada, first President of the Republic of Chile (1826).

During the 19th and early 20th century, the First Lady was considered one of the most influential figures of Chilean high society. As the wife of the President, the first ladies fulfilled the role as hostesses of ceremonies, especially after the President moved to the La Moneda Palace in 1845, and were in charge of the decoration of the presidential residences. Also, they participated in several charities and promoted different causes: Delfina de la Cruz and Emilia Márquez de la Plata, for example, organized events to support injured veterans, orphans and widowers caused by the War of the Pacific. In 1925, the First Lady had their own private office and staff, to support her role as the president of different charitable organizations created by the government.

During the 20th century, the role of the First Lady increased, in line with the empowered role women had in politics and became more visible to the general public, not just for the high society. Juana Rosa Aguirre , wife of Pedro Aguirre Cerda (president between 1938 and 1941), promoted the adoption of women's suffrage and helped the people affected by the 1939 Chillán earthquake. Other foundations created by the First Ladies by the middle of the 20th century included the Ropero del Pueblo (1947–1958) and CEMA Chile (1967–1990).

At the moment, no male presidential spouse has existed. The title of First Gentleman (Primer Caballero) has been proposed for this case, although colloquially the term Primer Damo was used to refer to Bachelet's son Sebastián Dávalos when he acted as her representative.

Vacancy 
The role of the First Lady has been vacant in six times, once by the death of the title holder and five times when the President has not been married. Usually in these cases, the role has been assumed by a close female relative.

 During Bernardo O'Higgins's rule as Supreme Director (1818-1823), his mother Isabel Riquelme acted in ceremonies similarly to a contemporary First Lady.
During Carlos Ibáñez del Campo's first presidency (1927-1931), before his marriage with Graciela Letelier in December 1927.
During Arturo Alessandri's second presidency (1932-1938), after his wife Rosa Rodríguez Velasco died in 1936.
During Jorge Alessandri's presidency (1958-1962), the role was assumed by Louise Schäffer, wife of Sótero del Río, his minister of Interior.
 During Michelle Bachelet's first presidency (2006-2010), the Director of the Social-Cultural Area of the Presidency was held first by former minister Adriana Delpiano and later by María Eugenia Hirmas, wife of minister Sergio Bitar. During her second presidency (2014-2018), the role was held first by her son Sebastián Dávalos and later by Paula Forttes. However, the ceremonial role of First Lady was unofficially fulfilled by Bachelet's mother, Ángela Jeria.

Although not married, President-elect Gabriel Boric announced that the role of the First Lady will be assumed by his couple and girlfriend Irina Karamanos.

Director of the Social-Cultural Area of the Presidency 
Michelle Bachelet, a divorced woman, created an administrative position under her direct appointment, the Director of the social-cultural area of the Presidency, to absorbe the different non-profit foundations of the presidency (Red de Fundaciones de la Presidencia de la República) that were traditionally managed by the First Lady. The foundations included are Integra, Promoción y Desarrollo de la Mujer, Prodemu (Women's promotion and development); Fundación de la Familia; Tiempos Nuevos; Museo Interactivo Mirador; Matucana 100 Cultural Center; the Chilean Youth Orchestras; Artesanías de Chile (Arts and crafts) and Todo Chilenter.

List of first ladies

Footnotes

References

 
Chile